Auguste Dupont, full name Pierre-Auguste Dupont, (9 February 1827 - 17 December 1890) was a Belgian pianist and composer.

A laureate of the Royal Conservatory of Liège, where he was a student of Jules Jalheau, he travelled for a time as a musician in Germany, England and the Netherlands. While performing in Berlin, he was introduced to Giacomo Meyerbeer who gave him work for a time and who often mentions him in his diary. In 1850, he became a professor at the Royal Conservatory of Brussels. He composed several major pieces for concerts and pieces of chamber music. He was also the editor of the series École de piano du Conservatoire de Bruxelles, forty booklets of classical masterpieces. He became a teacher of chamber music in 1886.

His brother was the violinist and composer Joseph Dupont.

Works 

 Pluie de mai, Étude de trilles pour piano (Op.2) 
 Grande Capriccio sur Robert le Diable 
 Le Staccato Perpétuel (Op.31)  
 Grande galop fantastique   
 Contes du foyer (Op. 12)  
 The Tickalicktoo Polka, Dedicated to the Esquimaux Family, Who Appeared Before Her Majesty at Windsor Castle, Feb. 3, 1854 
  Morgane  
 Suite en quintette 
 Intermezzo - barcarolle 
 Tocatelle pour piano (Op. 26) 
 Chanson hongroise (Op. 27)  
 Berceuse en la mineur pour piano (Op. 35)
 Trois Danses dans le style ancien (Op.37)  
 Fantasie et Fugue (for the right hand)(Op.41)    
 Roman en dix pages (Op. 48) 
 Piano Concerto in F minor (Op. 49) 
 La Pensée  
 Morceaux Caractéristiques 
 Feuille d'album : duettino pour piano et harpe ou 2 pianos (Op. 58)
 Valse expressive pour piano (Op. 60) 
In 1862, L'Illustration p. 197, mentioned the following works:
 Poème d'amour, Sept chants lyriques [op. 54]
 Reminiscences Pastorales
 Rêveries sur l'eau
 Trio en sol mineur pour piano, violon et violoncelle (Op. 33)
 Grand quatuor
 Sonate
 Marche druïdique
 Une Chanson de jeune fille (Op.18)
 Chanson du feu
 Danse des ombres
 Danse des Almées

Honours 
 Chevalier de l'Ordre du Lion (1856).

References 

Romantic composers
Belgian classical pianists
19th-century classical pianists
19th-century composers
Academic staff of the Royal Conservatory of Brussels
Royal Conservatory of Liège alumni
People from Verviers
1827 births
1890 deaths